Sophie Wu (born 23 December 1983) is a British actress, known for her roles in films such as Kick-Ass and TV series such as The Fades as Jay, The Midnight Beast as Zoe, plus the second and third series of Fresh Meat as Heather.

Life and career
Sophie Wu was born to a Chinese father and to a Scottish mother. She went to school in Scotland before studying at the London Academy of Music and Dramatic Art (LAMDA) between 2003 and 2006. After graduating, she began acting in television series, including Casualty and Hotel Babylon, before going on to have the supporting role of Kiki, in comedy film Wild Child opposite Emma Roberts, in 2008.

In 2010, her next film role came as the character of Erika Cho in the U.S. comic-book film adaptation Kick-Ass and 2013-sequel Kick-Ass 2. In 2011, she appeared in the BBC Three television series The Fades playing the role of Anne's friend, Jay. Later in 2012 she played the role of Stefan Abingdon's girlfriend, Zoe, in the sitcom The Midnight Beast, then she appeared in her second project with Kimberley Nixon, the second and third series of Fresh Meat, as recurring character, Heather.

Wu is also a writer. In 2014, Wu wrote and performed in a one-woman show, "Sophie Wu is Minging, She Looks Like She's Dead". She wrote a monologue for the BBC program The Break (2016–present). She wrote a play titled "Ramona Tells Jim", which premiered in 2017.

Filmography

Film

Television

References

External links
  résumé on Curtis Brown
 

1983 births
Living people
21st-century British actresses
British film actresses
British actresses of Chinese descent
British people of Scottish descent
British television actresses